Jim Battle (born February 20, 1938) is a former professional football player in the National Football League (NFL) and Canadian Football League (CFL). He played in 14 games for the Minnesota Vikings before joining the Edmonton Eskimos in the CFL in 1964. He played in college at Southern University. He went to high school at Union Academy in Bartow, Florida.

References

 

Players of American football from Minnesota
Players of American football from Florida
1938 births
Living people
Southern Jaguars football players
American football guards
Sportspeople from Bartow, Florida
Minnesota Vikings players
American players of Canadian football
Edmonton Elks players